John Bain may refer to:

John Bain (soccer) (born 1957), retired Scottish-US soccer midfielder
John Bain (footballer, born 1854) (1854–1929), English amateur footballer
John Bain or TotalBiscuit (1984–2018), British game commentator and critic
John J. Bain, headmaster of Oratory Preparatory School

See also

John Baines (disambiguation)
John MacBain (born 1958), Canadian businessman and philanthropist
John McBain (disambiguation)